In mathematics, a  Schottky group is a special sort of Kleinian group, first studied by  .

Definition

Fix some point p on the Riemann sphere. Each Jordan curve not passing through p divides the Riemann sphere into two pieces, and we call the piece containing p the "exterior" of the curve, and the other piece its "interior". Suppose there are 2g disjoint Jordan curves A1, B1,..., Ag, Bg in the Riemann sphere with disjoint interiors. If there are Möbius transformations Ti taking the outside of Ai onto the inside of Bi, then the group generated by these transformations is a Kleinian group. A Schottky group is any Kleinian group that can be constructed like this.

Properties

A fundamental domain for the action of a Schottky group G on its regular points Ω(G) in the Riemann sphere is given by the exterior of the Jordan curves defining it. The corresponding quotient space Ω(G)/G is given by joining up the Jordan curves in pairs, so is a compact Riemann surface of genus g. This is the boundary of the 3-manifold given by taking the quotient (H∪Ω(G))/G of 3-dimensional hyperbolic H space plus the regular set Ω(G) by the Schottky group G, which is a handlebody of genus g. Conversely any compact Riemann surface of genus g can be obtained from some Schottky group of genus g.

Classical and non-classical Schottky groups

A Schottky group is called classical if all the disjoint Jordan curves corresponding to some set of generators can be chosen to be circles.   gave an indirect and non-constructive proof of the existence of non-classical Schottky groups, and  gave an explicit example of one. It has been shown by   that all finitely generated classical Schottky groups have limit sets of Hausdorff dimension bounded above strictly by a universal constant less than 2. Conversely,   has proved that there exists a universal lower bound on the Hausdorff dimension of limit sets of all non-classical Schottky groups.

Limit sets of Schottky groups

The limit set of a Schottky group, the complement of Ω(G), always has Lebesgue measure zero, but can have positive d-dimensional Hausdorff measure for d < 2. It is perfect and nowhere dense with positive logarithmic capacity.

The statement on Lebesgue measures follows for classical Schottky groups from the existence of the Poincaré series

Poincaré showed that the series | ci |−4 is summable over the non-identity elements of the group. In fact taking a closed disk  in the interior of the fundamental domain, its images under different group elements are disjoint and contained in a fixed disk about 0. So the sums of the areas is finite. By the changes of variables formula, the area is greater than a constant times | ci |−4.

A similar argument implies that the limit set has Lebesgue measure zero. For it is contained in the complement of union of the images of the fundamental region by group elements with word length bounded by n. This is a finite union of circles so has finite area. That area is bounded above by a constant times the contribution to the Poincaré sum of elements of word length n, so decreases to 0.

Schottky space

Schottky space (of some genus g ≥ 2) is the space of marked Schottky groups of genus g, in other words the space of sets of g elements of PSL2(C) that generate a Schottky group, up to equivalence under Möbius transformations . It is a complex manifold of complex dimension 3g−3. It contains classical Schottky space as the subset corresponding to classical Schottky groups.

Schottky space of genus g is not simply connected in general, but its universal covering space can be identified with Teichmüller space of compact genus g Riemann surfaces.

See also
Beltrami equation
Riley slice

Notes

References

David Mumford, Caroline Series, and David Wright, Indra's Pearls: The Vision of Felix Klein, Cambridge University Press, 2002

External links

Kleinian groups
Group theory
Discrete groups
Lie groups